Nina Sandberg  (born 18 February 1967) is a Norwegian politician. 
She served as mayor of Nesodden from 2011 to 2017, and was elected representative to the Storting for the period 2017–2021 for the Labour Party.

Career
Sandberg is a political scientist (cand.polit.) by education. From 1994 she was appointed at the research institute NIFU.

References

1967 births
Living people
Labour Party (Norway) politicians
Members of the Storting
Mayors of places in Akershus
Women mayors of places in Norway
People from Nesodden
Women members of the Storting